Pallacanestro Petrarca Padova, is an Italian amateur basketball club based in Padua, Veneto. It plays in the fourth division Serie C as of the 2015–16 season.

History
The club played in the first division Serie A from 1959 to 1969 and 1971 to 1973, taking part in the second division Serie A2 from 1993 to 1997.

In July 2015, Petrarca Padova combined with Pro Pace Pallacanestro Mortise to form a new club.

Notable players
 Renzo Bariviera
 Dexter Cambridge
 Roberto Chiacig
 John Fox
 Chad Gillaspy
 Radivoj Korać
 Doug Moe
 Denis Marconato
 Darren Morningstar

Head coaches
 Aleksandar Nikolić
 Ivan Mrázek

See also
Fondazione Unione Sportiva Petrarca

References

External links
Lega Nazionale Pallacanestro profile 
Serie A historical results  Retrieved 24 August 2015

1934 establishments in Italy
Basketball teams established in 1934
Basketball teams in Veneto
Sport in Padua